Sondra is a feminine Greek given name meaning protector of man.  By 2013, the name reached the verge of extinction in the United States; it had reached a peak of usage in 1939.

The name may refer to:

People:
Sondra Erickson (born 1942), American Republican politician
Sondra Gotlieb (born 1936), Canadian journalist and novelist
Sondra Locke (1944-2018), American actress and director
Sondra Marshak (born 1942), American science fiction writer 
Sondra Peterson (born 1935), model in the 1950s and 1960s
Sondra Radvanovsky (born 1969), American operatic soprano
Sondra Theodore (born 1956), American model and actress, Playboy Playmate of the Month for July 1977

Fictional characters:
Sondra Tibideaux, eldest daughter of Cliff and Clair Huxtable in The Cosby Show
 Sondra McCallister, a character from the Home Alone franchise.
Sondra Pransky, lead character of Woody Allen's 2006 film Scoop
Sondra Bizet, love interest of Ronald Colman's character in Lost Horizon (1937 film)
Sondra Finchley, from Theodore Dreiser's novel An American Tragedy
Sondra Fuller, the fourth Clayface, a DC Comics enemy of Batman

In Music
 Sondra (album), a 1981 album by The Sports

In Outdoors Profession
Sondra Rankin, FLW Tournament angler, Television host World Series of Bass, NBC SPORTS, outdoor and lifestyle blogger and enthusiast, Nashville recording artist, singer/songwriter (The New Girl), born in 1978

References

Given names of Greek language origin